Blagoveshchensk (Blagoveşçen) is a town in the Republic of Bashkortostan, Russia, located  north of Ufa on the right bank of the Belaya River. Population:

History
It was founded in 1756 as a settlement serving the copper melting works and was granted town status in 1941.

Administrative and municipal status
Within the framework of administrative divisions, Blagoveshchensk serves as the administrative center of Blagoveshchensky District, even though it is not a part of it. As an administrative division, it is incorporated separately as the town of republic significance of Blagoveshchensk—an administrative unit with the status equal to that of the districts. As a municipal division, the town of republic significance of Blagoveshchensk is incorporated within Blagoveshchensky Municipal District as Blagoveshchensk Urban Settlement.

References

Notes

Sources

External links
Official website of Blagoveshchensk 
Blagoveshchensk Business Directory 

Cities and towns in Bashkortostan
Ufa Governorate
Populated places established in 1756